The narrowtail catshark (Schroederichthys maculatus) is a catshark of the family Scyliorhinidae, found off the coasts of Honduras and Nicaragua, between latitudes 18° N and 10° N, at depths between . The reproduction of this catshark is oviparous.

Description
The dorsal surface and flanks are light grey or tan, spotted with white. Juveniles have six to nine light brown saddle-shaped markings dorsally, but these fade in adulthood. The underparts are pale.

Distribution
The narrowtail catshark is endemic to the Caribbean Sea where it is found off the coasts of Honduras, Nicaragua and Colombia, and in the area of sea between Honduras and Jamaica. It prefers to be above seabeds composed of fine calcareous materials.

Ecology
The narrowtail catshark is a demersal species, cruising along close to the seabed and feeding mainly on small fish and cephalopods. One specimen was found to have algae in its stomach. This catshark is oviparous, the female probably producing one egg in each oviduct, and the developing embryos depending on the egg yolk for nourishment. Because this species retains the same body proportions at all ages while other members of the genus do not, it has been suggested that it is a pedomorphic dwarf, retaining its juvenile form and maturing at a much smaller size than other members of the genus.

Status
Very little is known about this shark and its ecology. It has a restricted range but is subject to little fishing pressure because there are no commercial trawl fisheries operating in the Caribbean Sea at the depths at which this fish lives. In the absence of known threats, the population is presumed to be stable, and the International Union for Conservation of Nature has assessed its conservation status as being of "least concern".

References

narrowtail catshark
Fish of Honduras
Fish of Nicaragua
narrowtail catshark